El Alto Zapotec (Zapoteco de San Pedro el Alto), also known as South Central Zimatlan Zapotec, is a Zapotec language of Oaxaca, Mexico, spoken in the towns of San Pedro el Alto, San Antonino el Alto, and San Andrés el Alto.

It has 20% intelligibility with the most similar variety of Zapotec, Totomachapan Zapotec.

References

External links 
OLAC resources in and about the El Alto Zapotec language

Zapotec languages